Plant breeding is process of development of new cultivars. Plant breeding involves development of varieties for different environmental conditions – some of them are not favorable. Among them, heat stress is one of such factor that reduces the production and quality significantly.  So breeding against heat is a very important criterion for breeding for current as well as future environments produced by global climate change (e.g. global warming).

Breeding for heat stress tolerance in plants 

Heat stress due to increased temperature is a very important problem globally.  Occasional or prolonged high temperatures cause different morpho-anatomical, physiological and biochemical changes in plants. The ultimate effect is on plant growth as well as development and reduced yield and quality. Breeding for heat stress tolerance can be mitigated by breeding plant varieties that have improved levels of thermo-tolerance using different conventional or advanced genetic tools. Marker assisted selection techniques for breeding are highly useful. Recently 41 polymorphic SSR markers has been identified between a heat tolerant rice variety 'N22' and heat susceptible-high yielding variety 'Uma' for the development of new 'high yielding-heat tolerant' rice varieties.

What is heat stress tolerance 

Heat stress is defined as increased temperature level sufficient to cause irreversible damage to plant growth and development. Generally a temperature rise, above usually 10 to 15 °C above ambient, can be considered heat shock or heat stress. Heat tolerance is broadly defined as the ability of the plant tolerate heat – means that grow and produce economic yield under high temperatures.

Significance: current and future - global warming 

Heat stress is a serious threat to crop production globally (Hall, 2001, 1992). Global warming is particularly consequence of increased level of green house gases such as CO2, methane, chlorofluorocarbons and nitrous oxides. The  Intergovernmental Panel on Climatic Change (IPCC) has predicted a rise of 0.3 °C per decade (Jones et al., 1999)  reaching to approximately 1 and 3 °C above the present value by 2025 and 2100 AD, respectively.

Physiological consequence of heat stress 
At very high temperatures cause severe cellular injury and cell death may occur within short time, thus leading to a catastrophic collapse of cellular organization (Schoffl et al., 1999). However, under moderately high temperatures, the injury can only occur after longer exposure to such a temperature however the plant efficiency can be severely affected. High temperature directly affect injuries such as protein denaturation and aggregation, and increased fluidity of membrane lipids. Other indirect or slower heat injuries involve inactivation of enzymes in chloroplast and mitochondria, protein degradation, inhibition of protein synthesis,  and loss of membrane integrity. Heat stress associated injuries ultimately lead to starvation, inhibition of growth, reduced ion flux, production of toxic compounds and production of reactive oxygen species (ROS). Immediately after exposure to high temperature stress-related proteins are expressed as stress defense strategy of the cell. 
Expression of heat shock proteins (HSPs), protein with 10 to 200 kDa, is supposed to be involved in signal transduction during heat stress. In many species it has been demonstrated that HSPs results in improved physiological phenomena such as photosynthesis, assimilate partitioning, water and nutrient use efficiency, and membrane stability.

Studies have found tremendous variation within and between species, thus this will help to breed heat tolerance for future environment.  Some of attempts to develop heat-tolerant genotypes are successful. (Ehlers and Hall, 1998; Camejo et al., 2005 
)

Traits associated with heat stress tolerance 

Different physiological mechanisms may contribute to heat tolerance in the field—for example, heat tolerant metabolism as indicated by higher
photosynthetic rates, stay-green, and membrane thermo-stability, or heat avoidance as indicated by canopy temperature depression. Several physiological and morphological traits have been evaluated for heat tolerance - Canopy temperature, leaf chlorophyll, stay green, leaf conductance, spike number, biomass, and flowering date.

(a) Canopy temperature depression (CTD)

CTD has shown clear association with yield in warm environments shows it association with heat stress tolerance. CTD shows high genetic correlation with yield and high values of proportion of direct response to selection (Reynolds et al., 1998) indicating that the trait is heritable and therefore amenable to early generation selection. Since an integrated CTD value can be measured almost instantaneously on scores of plants in a small breeding plot (thus reducing error normally associated with traits measured on individual plants), work has been conducted to evaluate its potential as an indirect selection criterion for genetic gains in yield. CTD is affected by many physiological factors, which makes it a powerful.

(b) Stomatal conductance

Canopy temperature depression is highly suitable for selecting physiologically superior lines in warm, low relative humidity environments where high evaporative demand leads to leaf cooling of up to 10 °C below ambient temperatures. This permits differences among genotypes to be detected relatively easily using infrared thermometry. However, such differences cannot be detected in high relative humidity environments because the effect of evaporative cooling of leaves is negligible. Porometry can be used to screen individual plants. The heritability of stomatal conductance is reasonably high, with reported values typically in the range of 0.5 to 0.8. Plants can be assessed for leaf conductance using a viscous flow porometer that is  available on the market (Thermoline and CSIRO, Australia). This instrument can give a relative measure of stomatal conductance in a few seconds, making it possible to identify physiologically superior genotypes from within bulks.

(C)  Membrane thermostability 

Although resistance to high temperatures involves several complex tolerance and avoidance mechanisms, the membrane is thought to be a site of
primary physiological injury by heat, and measurement of solute leakage from tissue can be used to estimate damage to membranes. Since membrane thermostability is reasonably heritable (Fokar et al., 1998)  and shows high genetic correlation with yield.

(D) Chlorophyll fluorescence  
 
Chlorophyll fluorescence, an indication of the fate of excitation energy in the photosynthetic apparatus, has been used indicator for heat stress tolerance.

(E) Chlorophyll content and stay green

Chlorophyll content and stay green traits have been found to be associated with heat stress tolerance.,.
Xu et al. (2000)  identified three QTLs for chlorophyll content (Chl1, Chl2, and Chl3) (coincided with three stay-green QTL regions (Stg1, Stg2, and Stg3)) were identified in Sorghum. The Stg1 and Stg2 regions also contain the genes for key photosynthetic enzymes, heat shock proteins, and an abscisic acid (ABA) responsive gene.

(F) Photosynthesis

Declined photosynthesis is suggested as measure of heat stress sensitivity in plants.

(G) Stem reserve remobilization

Combination breeding and physiological breeding 
The physiological-trait-based breeding approach has merit over breeding for yield per se because it increases the probability of crosses resulting in additive gene action. The concept of combination phenomics comes from the idea that two or more stress have common physiological effect or common traits - which is an indicator of overall plant health. Similar analogy in human medical terms is high blood pressure or high body temperature or high white blood cells in body is an indicator of health problems and thus we can select healthy people from unhealthy using such a measure. As both abiotic and abiotic stresses can result in similar physiological consequence, tolerant plant can be separated from sensitive plants. Some imaging or infrared measuring techniques can help to speed the process for breeding process. For example, spot blotch intensity and canopy temperature depression can be monitored with canopy temperature depression.

See also 
 Upland rice
 Molecular breeding
 Breeding for drought stress tolerance

References

External links 
 PHYSIOLOGICAL INTERVENTIONS in BREEDING FOR ADAPTATION to abiotic stress
 http://library.wur.nl/frontis/gene-plant-crop/11_reynolds.pdf
 Physiological approaches to wheat breeding
 http://www.fao.org/docrep/006/y4011e/y4011e0a.htm
 Application of physiology in wheat breeding, CIMMYT book chapter
 https://web.archive.org/web/20120426070754/http://apps.cimmyt.org/research/wheat/map/research_results/wphysio/WPhysio_adaptation.pdf

Plant breeding